Jans Koerts (born 24 August 1969) is a Dutch former professional road bicycle racer. He was professional from 1992 until 2007.

Palmarès

1989
 1st, Omloop Houtse Linies
1990
 1st, Overall, Sachsen Tour
 1st, Stage 4, Teleflex Tour
1991
 1st, Stage 1, OZ Wielerweekend
 1st, Ronde van Noord-Holland
 1st, Ster van Zwolle
 1st, Stage 4, Circuit Franco-Belge
 1st, Stage 5a, Circuit Franco-Belge, Wasquehal (BEL)
1992
 1st, Ronde van Limburg
1994
 1st, Grand Prix de Denain
 1st, Stage 1, Tour du Poitou-Charentes
1995
 1st, GP Briek Schotte
 1st, GP Stad Sint-Niklaas
 1st, Dentergem
 1st, Buggenhout
 1st, Omloop van het Houtland
1996
 1st, Stage 2, Commonwealth Bank Classic
 1st, Stage 3, Commonwealth Bank Classic
 1st, GP Rik Van Steenbergen
 1st, Stage 2, Teleflex Tour
 1st, Wielsbeke
 1st, Strombeek-Bever
 1st, Grote Prijs Jef Scherens
1998
 1st, Affligem
 1st, Stage 1, Commonwealth Bank Classic
 1st, Stage 6, Commonwealth Bank Classic
 1st, Ruddervoorde
 1st, Stage 5, Post Danmark Rundt
1999
 1st, Stage 1, Commonwealth Bank Classic
 1st, Overall, OZ Wielerweekend
1st, Stage 1,
 1st, Profronde van Surhuisterveen
 1st, Ronde van Noord-Holland
 1st, Stage 3, Rapport Toer
 1st, Stage 6, Rapport Toer
 1st, Stage 1, Giro del Capo
 1st, Stage 4, Giro del Capo
 1st, Stage 2, Ster der Beloften
 1st, Stage 1, Niedersachsen-Rundfahrt
 1st, Stage 2, Niedersachsen-Rundfahrt
 1st, Ronde van Drenthe
 1st, Izegem
 1st, Stage 3, Rheinland-Pfalz Rundfahrt
 1st, GP Wielerrevue
 1st, Stage 4, Commonwealth Bank Classic
2000
 1st, Stage 1, Commonwealth Bank Classic
 1st, Stage 2, Commonwealth Bank Classic
 1st, Eindhoven
 1st, Omloop van het Waasland-Kemzeke
 1st, Stage 3a, Three Days of De Panne
 1st, Sparkassen Giro
 1st, Epe, Derny
 1st, Stage 3, Tour of Spain
2001
 1st, Profronde van Zwolle
 1st, Stage 4, Tour de Langkawi
 1st, Stage 6, Tour de Langkawi
 1st, Stage 3, Paris–Nice
 1st, Stage 4, Tour de Picardie
 1st, Clarendon Cup
  Dutch National Road Race Championship
 1st, Profronde van Heerlen
 Peperbus Profspektakel
2003
 1st, Stage 2, Tour of Belgium
 1st, Brussel–Ingooigem
 1st, Stage 4, Sachsen Tour
 1st, Stage 4, Post Danmark Rundt
 1st, Tour Beneden-Maas (Tour de Rijke)
 1st, Grand Prix d'Isbergues
 1st, Ronde van Noord-Holland
2004
 1st, Tour de Rijke
2021
 2nd, Just Ride Zwift Challenge

External links 

1969 births
Living people
People from Lochem
Dutch male cyclists
Dutch Vuelta a España stage winners
Cyclists from Gelderland